Morris Castle (also known as Castle Graig) is the name given to a ruined building that is situated off Trewyddfa Road in the Trewyddfa area of Swansea, South Wales. It was built between 1768 and 1774/5 on behalf of Sir John Morris to house the families of workers at his industrial enterprises (mainly the copper works of Landore).

Description
The building originally consisted of four interconnected towers, each four stories tall. The towers were connected by blocks which were three stories tall, surrounding a central courtyard. Today, the structure is derelict, with only partial remains of two towers still standing, although several features of the building can still be seen, including the fireplaces, chimneys, and some of the windows.

History

In 1815, Walter Davies, in collaboration with Edward Williams, wrote a survey of the economy of South Wales, and said of Sir John Morris that, "he seems to have been the most extensive individual builder of comfortable habitations for the labouring class. He first erected a kind of castellated lofty mansion, of a collegiate appearance, with an interior quadrangle, containing the dwellings for forty families, all colliers, excepting one tailor, and one shoemaker, who are considered as useful appendages to the fraternity."

The building was occupied until around 1850, when nearby opencast mining made the structure unsafe.

Recent history
On 25 January 1990, the easternmost wall of the structure collapsed in high winds during a storm. The building was purchased from the Beaufort Estate by Swansea City Council and is also listed as a Scheduled Ancient Monument with Cadw.

References

External links
 Data Wales: Morris Castle
 Treboeth History Group

History of Swansea
Mock castles in Wales
Buildings and structures in Swansea